The University of Juba is an English-language public university located in Juba, South Sudan. It was founded in 1975 under by the former Vice president of and President of Southern Sudan, Abel Alier Kwai. The university was temporarily relocated to Khartoum as a result of the Second Sudanese Civil War, and moved back to Juba in July 2011, after South Sudan obtained independence. It is the best university in south  Sudan.

Schools

 School of Public Service
 School of Medicine
 School of Business and Management
 School of Law
 School of Education
 School of Art, Music & Drama
 School of Social & Economic Studies
 School of Engineering & Architecture
 School of Community Studies & Rural Development
 School of Arts & Humanities
 School of Computer Sciences & Information Technology
 School of Applied & Industrial Science
 School of Natural Resources & Environment Studies (Mother School)
 School of Veterinary Medicine
 School of Journalism, Media and Communication
 School of Mathematics
 School of Nursing 
 Public health

Specialized centres
 Centre for Human Resource Development & Continuing Education
 Centre for Languages and Translation
 Centre for Distance Education
 Centre for Peace and Development
  Centre for Translation and Languages
 ODEL Centre

Institutes
 Institute of Peace, Diplomacy and Security Studies
 National Transformational Leadership Institute
 French institute

Colleges
 Kuajok Community College
 Graduate College

See also
 Central Equatoria
 Education in South Sudan
 Equatoria
 Juba County
 List of universities in South Sudan

References

External links
 Official University of Juba website
 College of Applied & Industrial Sciences Official Website
 "University of Juba Press Release on the Incident at Kaduro Campus", Sudan Media Centre, 16 February 2006 
 "South Sudan govt to renovate Juba University" Sudan Tribune, 20 September 2006 Archived here.
 "University of Juba cuts intake by 75%", The Juba Post, 22 June 2006 

 
University of Juba
University of Juba
Universities and colleges in South Sudan
University of Juba
University of Juba